Sadistic Symphony is the eighth album by American heavy metal band Vicious Rumors, released in 2001.

Track listing
"Break" – 5:06
"Sadistic Symphony" – 5:47
"March of the Damned" – 5:17
"Blacklight" – 8:06
"Puritan Demons" – 4:17
"Born Again Hard" – 3:47
"Neodymium Man" – 4:35
"Elevator to Hell" – 3:55
"Cerebral Sea" – 4:53
"Ascension" – 1:24
"Liquify" – 5:11

Personnel
 Geoff Thorpe: Guitars, Vocals
 Ira Black: Guitars
 Morgan Thorn: Vocals
 Cornbread: Bass

Additional musicians
 Mark McGee: Additional Guitars (Tracks 2,4,5,7,9)
 Atma Anur: Drums (Track 1–10)
 James Murphy: Lead Guitar Solo (Track 11)
 Bill Ackerman: Drums (Track 11)

References

2001 albums
Vicious Rumors albums